Count Bobby, The Terror of The Wild West (German: Graf Bobby, der Schrecken des wilden Westens) is a 1966 Austrian musical comedy film directed by Paul Martin and starring Peter Alexander, Olga Schoberová and Gunther Philipp. It was the last in a trilogy of films featuring the character Count Bobby. It drew some inspiration from the ongoing series of Karl May film adaptations set in the Wild West.

The film's sets were designed by the art director Fritz Jüptner-Jonstorff. It was shot at studios in Belgrade, and on location around Yugoslavia which stood in for the American west as it frequently did in German films of the decade.

Synopsis
An impoverished Viennese aristocrat inherits an estate in Arizona and travels out hoping that it is a lucrative gold mine.

Cast
 Peter Alexander as Graf Bobby von Pichulsky 
 Olga Schoberová as Milli Miller 
 Gunther Philipp as Baron Mucki von Kalk 
 Hanne Wieder as Jezabel 
 Elisabeth Markus as Tante Sophie 
 Vladimir Medar as Doc Ted W. Harper 
 Dragomir Felba as Sheriff Martin Miller 
 Rastko Tadic
 Zivojin Denic as Pedro Gonzalez 
 Jovan Janicijevic-Burdus as Kiddy 
 Milivoje Popovic-Mavid as Buggy

References

Bibliography 
 Robert von Dassanowsky. Austrian Cinema: A History. McFarland, 2005.

External links 
 

1966 films
1966 musical comedy films
Austrian musical comedy films
1960s German-language films
Films directed by Paul Martin
Austrian sequel films
Films set in Vienna
Films set in Arizona
Sascha-Film films